The 2nd constituency of Haute-Corse is a French legislative constituency in the Haute-Corse département.

Deputies

Election results

2022

2017

2012

2007

References

Sources
 *
 

2